Philip Ayres (1638–1712), the author of numerous books and pamphlets, flourished in the latter part of the seventeenth century; was born at Cottingham, and educated at Westminster, and St John's College, Oxford. He became tutor in the family of Montague Garrard Drake, of Agmondesham, Bucks, and lived in the family till his death on 1 December 1712. His chief work is his Lyric poems made in imitation of the Italians, 1687, a collection of original pieces and translations. One copy of verses is addressed to "his honoured friend" John Dryden.

Works
The following is a list of Ayres's works in chronological order:
 A short Account of the Life and Death of Pope Alexander VII, by P. A. Gent., 1667.
 Pax Redux, or the Christian Reconciler. Done out of the French by P. A., 1670.
 The Fortunate Fool, written in Spanish by A. G. de Salas Barbadillo. Translated by Philip Ayres, Gent., 1670.
 Count Nadasdy's Hungarian Rebellion, translated by P. A. Gent., 1672.
 The Count of Gabalis, 1680, from the French of the Abbe de Montfaucon de Villars.
 Emblemata Amatoria. Emblems of Love. In four languages, Latin, English, Italian, French, 1683.
 The Voyages and Adventures of Captain Barth. Sharp and others in the South Sea, &c., 1684.
 Vox Clamantis, or an Essay for the Honour, Happiness and Prosperity of the English Gentry, 1684.
 Mythologia Ethica, or Three Centuries of Æsopian Fables in English, 1689.
 The Revengeful Mistress, being an Amorous Adventure of an English Gentleman in Spain, 1696. This prose work is either a short novel or a novella.

References

Sources 
 

Attribution

1638 births
1712 deaths
17th-century English poets
17th-century English male writers
17th-century English writers
17th-century English novelists
Alumni of St John's College, Oxford
British male poets
English male novelists